Borislav Baldzhiyski (born 12 October 1990) is a Bulgarian footballer who plays as an attacking midfielder for Bulgarian Third League club Botev Ihtiman.

Career

Levski Sofia
Born in Ihtiman, Baldzhiyski joined the youth academy of Levski Sofia and represented the club at all youth levels. He finally signed a full contract on 14 October 2008, at the age of 18. On 10 September 2009 Baldzhiyski started training with the first team. On the next day, he signed his new contract with Levski, with a better salary, connected him with the team until 2013. Baldzhiyski made his first appearance in the first team in a 2–0 win against Brestnik 1948 in a match of the Bulgarian Cup on 9 December 2009.

On 11 January 2010, Borislav was sent to Lokomotiv Mezdra on loan for six months. On 9 June 2010 he returned to Levski. In January 2011, Borislav was sent to Nesebar on loan for six months.

Chernomorets Burgas
On 16 June 2011, Baldzhiyski was transferred to Chernomorets Burgas as a part of the deal for Orlin Starokin to Levski Sofia. He is released in late May 2013.

Cherno More
On 17 December 2016, Baldzhiyski signed with Cherno More for  years. He made his debut against CSKA Sofia in a 0–2 home defeat on 19 February. On 22 August 2017, Baldzhiyski's contract was terminated by mutual consent.

Montana
On 24 August 2017, Baldzhiyski returned to Montana, signing a two year contract.  However, he was released at the end of the 2017–18 season.

Murder charges
Borislav Baldzhiyski was arrested for the murder of a 36-year-old man on August 6, 2013. If found guilty, he could be sentenced from 10 to 20 years in prison. In September 2016, the Sofia city court declared him guilty of the lesser charge of manslaughter due to carelessness, imposing a four-year prison sentence. On 4 July 2019 he was convicted guilty causing death by negligence, being conditionally sentenced to 2 years in prison with a maximum probation period of 5 years.

Career statistics

References

External links 
 
 Profile at Levskisofia.info 

1990 births
Living people
Bulgarian footballers
Bulgaria under-21 international footballers
Association football midfielders
PFC Levski Sofia players
PFC Lokomotiv Mezdra players
PFC Nesebar players
PFC Chernomorets Burgas players
PFC Slavia Sofia players
FC Montana players
PFC Cherno More Varna players
FC Dunav Ruse players
FC Tsarsko Selo Sofia players
First Professional Football League (Bulgaria) players
Sportspeople from Sofia Province